The 1981 San Francisco Giants season was the Giants' 99th season in Major League Baseball, their 24th season in San Francisco since their move from New York following the 1957 season, and their 22nd at Candlestick Park. Giants manager Frank Robinson became the first black manager in the history of the National League. Robinson was also the first black manager in the history of the American League.

Offseason 
 December 8, 1980: Chris Bourjos and Bob Knepper were traded by the Giants to the Houston Astros for Enos Cabell.
 December 9, 1980: DeWayne Buice was drafted from the Giants by the Oakland Athletics in the 1980 minor league draft.
 December 12, 1980: John Montefusco and Craig Landis (minors) were traded by the Giants to the Atlanta Braves for Doyle Alexander.
 December 12, 1980: Joe Strain and Philip Nastu were traded by the Giants to the Chicago Cubs for Jerry Martin, Jesús Figueroa, and a player to be named later. The Cubs completed the deal by sending Mike Turgeon (minors) to the Giants on August 11, 1981.
 February 9, 1981: Joe Morgan was signed as a free agent by the Giants.
 March 23, 1981: Billy Smith was purchased by the Giants from the Philadelphia Phillies.
 March 31, 1981: Gorman Heimueller was released by the Giants.

Regular season

Season standings

Record vs. opponents

Opening Day starters 
Vida Blue
Enos Cabell
Jack Clark
Darrell Evans
Larry Herndon
Johnnie LeMaster
Milt May
Joe Morgan
Billy North

Notable transactions 
 May 17, 1981: Phil Ouellette was signed by the Giants as an amateur free agent.
 August 3, 1981: Mike Sadek was released by the Giants.

Roster

Player stats

Batting

Starters by position 
Note: Pos = position; G = Games played; AB = At bats; H = Hits; Avg. = Batting average; HR = Home runs; RBI = Runs batted in

Other batters 
Note: G = Games played; AB = At bats; H = Hits; Avg. = Batting average; HR = Home runs; RBI = Runs batted in

Pitching

Starting pitchers 
Note: G = Games pitched; IP = Innings pitched; W = Wins; L = Losses; ERA = Earned run average; SO = Strikeouts

Other pitchers 
Note: G = Games pitched; IP = Innings pitched; W = Wins; L = Losses; ERA = Earned run average; SO = Strikeouts

Relief pitchers 
Note: G = Games pitched; IP = Innings pitched; W = Wins; L = Losses; SV = Saves; ERA = Earned run average; SO = Strikeouts

Awards and honors 
 1981 Larry Herndon LF, Willie Mac Award
All-Star Game
 Vida Blue, reserve

Farm system

References

External links
 1981 San Francisco Giants at Baseball Reference
 1981 San Francisco Giants at Baseball Almanac

San Francisco Giants seasons
San Francisco Giants Season, 1981
1981 in San Francisco
San